The 6th Regiment of Dragoons (6e Régiment de Dragons) is a French regiment of dragoon cavalry formed under the old regime, and dissolved in 1992.

Creation and renames
September 14, 1673: Creation as the Régiment d'Hocquincourt (Regiment of Hocquincourt)

 1675: Renamed to Régiment de Dragons de la Reine (Dragoons of the Queen)
 1791: Renamed to 6e Régiment de Dragons (6th Regiment of Dragoons)
 1814: Renamed to Régiment de Dragons de Monsieur (Dragoons of Gentlemen)
 1815: Renamed back to 6e Régiment de Dragons, dissolved after the Hundred Days
 1815: Recreated as Régiment de Dragons de la Loire (Dragoons of the Loire)
 1825: Renamed to 6e régiment de dragons
 1940: Dissolved
 1951: Recreated as 6e régiment de dragons
 1963: Dissolved
 1964: Recreated as 6e régiment de dragons out of the 3e Algerian Spahis Regiment
 1992: Final dissolution

Regimental Leaders
Until the French Revolution, the regimental leader were called mestre de camp, who owned the regiment they commanded. Beginning in 1791, the leader was referred to as a colonel. In reality, only the first dragoon regiment leader had this quality, his followers, being only mestre de camp-lieutenant, corresponding afterwards to lieutenant colonel.
 1673: Gabriel de Monchy
 1675: Mestre de Camp de Brizay, Viscount of Enonville
 1685: Mestre de Camp Nicolaï, Knight of Murçay
 1692: Mestre de Camp Texier, Marquis of Hautefeuille
 1704: Mestre de Camp Riencourt, Marquis of Orival
 1731: Mestre de Camp Lamber of Herbigny, Marquis of Thibouville
 1734: Mestre de Camp Chabannes, Marquis of Chabannes-Pionsac
 1740: Mestre de Camp Durey of Sauroy, Marquis of Terrail
 1748: Mestre de Camp Charles, Marquis of Morand
 1762: Mestre de Camp Grossoles, Earl of Flammarens
 1780: Mestre de Camp Franquetot, Knight of Coigny
 1784: Mestre de Camp Grammont, Duke of Guiche
 1788: Mestre de Camp Machault, Viscount of Machault
 1791: Colonel Louis-Marthe of Gouy d'Arsy
 1792: Colonel Marc Pierre de la Turmeliere
 1792: Colonel Blaise Duval "Duval de Hautmaret"
 1792: Colonel Adelaïde Blaise François "le Hare de la Grange"
 1792: Colonel Jacques Louis François Delaistre de Tilly
 1793: Chef de Brigade François Philibert Michel Pelicot
 1794: Chef de Brigade François Jourdan
 1794: Chef de Brigade Vincent
 1794: Chef de Brigade Jean-Louis-François Fauconnet
 1797: Chef de Brigade Jacques le Baron (Colonel in 1803)
 1807: Colonel Cyrille-Simon Picquet
 1809: Colonel Pierrre Alexis de Pinteville
 1813: Colonel Claude Mugnier
 1814: Colonel Jean-Baptiste Saviot
 1815: Colonel Dornier
 1823: Colonel Podenas
 1830: Colonel Lacour
 1834: Colonel Scherer
 1845: Colonel Beltramin
 1852: Colonel Robinet des Plas
 1855: Colonel Jean Jacques Paul Félix Ressayre
 1863: Colonel Bourboulon
 1869: Colonel Tillion
 1870: Colonel Fombert de Villiers
 1876: Colonel Maréchal
 1881: Colonel Rapp
 1887: Colonel Brossier de Buros
 1893: Colonel of Lestapis
 1898: Colonel of Sesmaisons
 1899: Colonel Faure
 1908: Colonel Trafford
 1912: Colonel Champeaux
 1914: Colonel of Champvallier
 1918: Colonel Joannard
 1925: Colonel Yvart
 1931: Colonel Barbe
 1933: Colonel of the Perrier de Larsan
 1936: Colonel Jacottet
 1951: Colonel of Soultrait
 1953: Colonel Ameil
 1956: Colonel Renoult
 1958: Lieutenant-Colonel Bonnefous
 1961: Lieutenant-Colonel Boileau
 1963: Lieutenant-Colonel Jeannerod
 1964: Lieutenant-Colonel le Diberder
 1967: Colonel Fournier
 1969: Lieutenant-Colonel O'Delant
 1971: Lieutenant-Colonel Maillard
 1972: Lieutenant-Colonel Carabin
 1974: Colonel Delcourt
 1976: Colonel of Cotton
 1978: Colonel Thiébaut
 1980: Colonel Burel
 1982: Colonel Winckel
 1984: Colonel Cailloux
 1986: Colonel Lefebvre
 1990: Colonel Françon
 1991: Lieutenant-Colonel Riediner

Regimental leaders killed or injured in combat 

 July 23, 1675: Knight of Hocquincourt (Killed)
 August 4, 1692: Knight of Murçay (Killed)
 April 26, 1794: Chef de Brigade Vincent (Killed)
 February 6, 1807: Colonel Lebaron (Killed)
 July 22, 1812: Colonel Picquet (Wounded)

Garrisons
In March 1788, the Régiment de Dragons de la Reine moved to Laon in a newly built barracks, which, as new as it was, is assigned to it a merry-go-round, a quarry, and even a hospital. Dragoons are sworn to the nation and the King and Queen on August 1789. Becoming the 6e Régiment de Dragons early in 1792 and this time, after swearing loyalty to the nation, the law, administrators of the executive, to maintain the Constitution with all its strength, never to abandon its guiding principles, to observe the rules of discipline and to live free or to die, the regiment nevertheless left the city the following year for the campaigns of the French Revolution and the French Empire. Laon was later destroyed by bombing during World War I, only a pediment inscribed on historic monuments remains. From the end of the empire in 1815 until the Franco-Prussian War, the regiment was mobile throughout the metropolitan territory and changed garrison almost every two years.  After the fall of the empire, the regiment was dissolved while garrisoned at Nîmes. It was reformed in 1816 in Haute-Saône under the name of Régiment de Dragons de la Loire. Before renaming back to the 6e Régiment de Dragons in 1825, the regiment was moved from Nancy, Charleville, Saint-Omer, Lille, and Verdun. It then passed through Lyon, Tours, Pontivy, Valenciennes, and Paris, where it took part in the riots of June 1832. It was continued to be moved through Dax, Limoges, Poitiers, Fonatinebleau, Sedan, Chalon-sur-Marne, Limoges, and Toul. In 1853, before leaving for the Crimea, it was stationed in Tarascon. After that, they were moved to Clermont-Ferran, back to Paris, Saint-Mihiel, Valenciennes, Lunéville, and Lyon. In 1870, the regiment was in Libourne, where they were at for a short time and then returned to Lyon. From this period, stability was established. From 1872 to 1880, the regiment was in Chambéry, where it had already been in between 1867 and 1869, where it concurred

World War I
It took part in the Battle of the Yser.

It took part in the Third Battle of the Aisne.

World War II
It was dissolved in 1940.

The Cold War
It was raised again as the 6th Dragoon Regiment in 1964 out of the 3e Régiment de Spahis Algériens. It was dissolved in 1992.

Honours

Battle honours
Marengo 1800
Austerlitz 1806
Friedland 1807
Kanghil 1855
L’Yser 1914
Picardie 1918

Decorations
Croix de guerre 1914–1918 with 1 palm
Croix de guerre 1939–1945 with 1 palm

Dragoon regiments of France
Military units and formations disestablished in 1992
20th-century regiments of France
Regiments of the Bourbon Restoration
Regiments of the French First Republic
Regiments of the First French Empire
Regiments of the July Monarchy
Military units and formations established in 1791